

Ælfric II was a medieval Bishop of Elmham.

Ælfric was consecrated between 1023 and 1038 and died in December 1038.

Notes

References

External links
 

Bishops of Elmham
1038 deaths
Year of birth unknown